Scopula rhodocraspeda is a moth of the  family Geometridae. It is found in Madagascar.

This species is mustard-yellow to apricot-yellow with the costal edge of the forewing rosy, also the fringes.
Possibly this is a colour-form of Scopula bistrigata (Pagenstecher).

References

rhodocraspeda
Moths described in 1932
Taxa named by Louis Beethoven Prout
Moths of Madagascar
Moths of Africa